Dominik Etlinger (born 19 February 1992) is a Croatian Greco-Roman wrestler. In 2019, he won one of the bronze medals in the 72 kg event at the 2019 European Wrestling Championships held in Bucharest, Romania.

In 2015, he won one of the bronze medals in the 71 kg event at the 2015 European Games held in Baku, Azerbaijan.

Major results

References

External links 
 

Living people
1992 births
Place of birth missing (living people)
Croatian male sport wrestlers
Wrestlers at the 2015 European Games
European Games bronze medalists for Croatia
European Games medalists in wrestling
European Wrestling Championships medalists
Mediterranean Games competitors for Croatia
Competitors at the 2013 Mediterranean Games
20th-century Croatian people
21st-century Croatian people